In multivariate calculus, a differential or differential form is said to be exact or perfect (exact differential), as contrasted with an inexact differential, if it is equal to the general differential  for some differentiable function  in an orthogonal coordinate system.

An exact differential is sometimes also called a total differential, or a full differential, or, in the study of differential geometry, it is termed an exact form.

The integral of an exact differential over any integral path is path-independent, and this fact is used to identify state functions in thermodynamics.

Overview

Definition
Even if we work in three dimensions here, the definitions of exact differentials for other dimensions are structurally similar to the three dimensional definition. In three dimensions, a form of the type

is called a differential form. This form is called exact on an open domain  in space if there exists some differentiable scalar function  defined on  such that

  

throughout , where  are orthogonal coordinates (e.g., Cartesian, cylindrical, or spherical coordinates). In other words, in some open domain of a space, a differential form is an exact differential if it is equal to the general differential of a differentiable function in an orthogonal coordinate system.

Note: In this mathematical expression, the subscripts outside the parenthesis indicate which variables are being held constant during differentiation. Due to the definition of the partial derivative, these subscripts are not required, but they are explicitly shown here as reminders.

Integral path independence 
If  is of differentiability class  (continuously differentiable), then  is a conservative vector field for the corresponding potential  by the definition.

The gradient theorem states

So it is concluded that the integral of an exact differential is independent of the choice of an integral path between given path endpoints (path independence).

For three dimensional spaces, if  defined on an open domain  is of differentiability class  (equivalently  is of ), then this integral path independence can also be proved by using the vector calculus identity  and the Stokes' theorem.

for a simply closed loop  with the smooth oriented surface  in it. If the open domain  is simply connected open space (roughly speaking, a single piece open space without a hole within it), then any irrotational vector field (defined as a  vector field  which curl is zero, i.e.) has the path independence by the Stokes' theorem, so the following statement is made; In a simply connected open region, any  vector field that has the path-independence property (so it is a conservative vector field.) must also be irrotational and vise versa. The equality of the path independence and conservative vector fields is shown here.

Thermodynamic state function 
In thermodynamics, when  is exact, the function  is a state function of the system: a mathematical function which depends solely on the current equilibrium state, not on the path taken to reach that state. Internal energy , Entropy , Enthalpy , Helmholtz free energy , and Gibbs free energy  are state functions. Generally, neither work  nor heat  is a state function. (Note:  is commonly used to represent heat in physics. It should not be confused with the use earlier in this article as the parameter of an exact differential.)

One dimension
In one dimension, a differential form

is exact if and only if  has an antiderivative (but not necessarily one in terms of elementary functions). If  has an antiderivative and let  be an antiderivative of  so , then  obviously satisfies the condition for exactness.

Two and three dimensions
By symmetry of second derivatives, for any "well-behaved" (non-pathological) function , we have

 

Hence, in a simply-connected region R of the xy-plane, a differential form

is an exact differential if and only if the equation

holds.

For three dimensions, in a simply-connected region R of the xyz-coordinate system, by a similar reason, a differential

is an exact differential if and only if between the functions A, B and C there exist the relations

; ; 

These conditions are equivalent to the following sentence: If G is the graph of this vector valued function then for all tangent vectors X,Y of the surface G then s(X, Y) = 0 with s the symplectic form.

These conditions, which are easy to generalize, arise from the independence of the order of differentiations in the calculation of the second derivatives. So, in order for a differential dQ, that is a function of four variables, to be an exact differential, there are six conditions (the combination ) to satisfy.

Partial differential relations

Substituting the first equation into the second and rearranging, we obtain

For this last equation to generally hold, the bracketed terms must be equal to zero. The left bracket equal to zero leads to the reciprocity relation while the right bracket equal to zero goes to the cyclic relation as shown below.

Reciprocity relation
Setting the first term in brackets equal to zero yields

A slight rearrangement gives a reciprocity relation,

Cyclic relation
The cyclic relation is also known as the cyclic rule or the Triple product rule. Setting the second term in brackets equal to zero yields

Some useful equations derived from exact differentials in two dimensions 

(See also Bridgman's thermodynamic equations for the use of exact differentials in the theory of thermodynamic equations)

Suppose that the state space is two-dimensional and any of the five quantities are differentiable. Then by the chain rule

but also by the chain rule:

and

so that (by substituting (2) and (3) into (1)):

which implies that (by comparing (4) with (1)):

Letting  in (5) gives:

Letting  in (5) gives:

using ( gives the triple product rule:

See also 
Closed and exact differential forms for a higher-level treatment
Differential (mathematics)
Inexact differential
Integrating factor for solving non-exact differential equations by making them exact
Exact differential equation

References 

Perrot, P. (1998). A to Z of Thermodynamics. New York: Oxford University Press.

External links
Inexact Differential – from Wolfram MathWorld
Exact and Inexact Differentials – University of Arizona
Exact and Inexact Differentials – University of Texas
Exact Differential – from Wolfram MathWorld

Thermodynamics
Multivariable calculus